Transbrasil Flight 801 (TR801/TBA801) was a scheduled cargo flight from Eduardo Gomes International Airport to São Paulo/Guarulhos International Airport that crashed on 21 March 1989. The Boeing 707 crashed into a heavily populated slum in Guarulhos  from the runway. The crash resulted in the death of all 3 crew members and 22 people on the ground. 200 people were injured.

Aircraft

The aircraft was a Boeing 707-349C registration PT-TCS with manufacturer serial number 19354 and line number 503. It was powered by 4 Pratt & Whitney JT3D-3B turbofan engines. Its maiden flight was on June 9, 1966, meaning it had been in service for 22 years and 10 months when it crashed. It had accumulated 61,000 flight hours.

The plane had been used in the filming of the 1970 disaster movie Airport. At the time it was owned by Flying Tiger Line. It was subsequently operated by Aer Lingus, EI AI and British Caledonian before being sold to Transbrasil.

Accident
The accident occurred at 11:54 am, Brasilia time. The aircraft was making a high speed approach to runway 09R of São Paulo/Guarulhos International Airport as the runway was set to be closed in 6 minutes' time for runway maintenance. One of the crew members activated the air brakes by mistake. This resulted in the aircraft losing too much airspeed and stalling. This was the first serious crash since the inauguration of São Paulo/Guarulhos International Airport on 20 January 1985.

Investigation and aftermath 
The investigation carried out by the Department of Civil Aviation at the time indicated that the accident was caused by human error. The aircraft had been inspected two months before the accident and was considered "fit" to operate.

See also 

 List of accidents and incidents involving commercial aircraft
 List of accidents and incidents involving the Boeing 707
 Transbrasil Flight 303

References

External links 
Final report 

Accidents and incidents involving the Boeing 707
Aviation accidents and incidents in Brazil
Aviation accidents and incidents in 1989
Airliner accidents and incidents caused by pilot error
March 1989 events in South America
1989 in Brazil